Sharon A. Williams (1951-2016) was a Canadian lawyer and legal scholar who served as a member of the Permanent Court of Arbitration at the Hague from 1991 to 1997, was a consultant to the Canadian Department of Justice on extradition matters, and was a Judge ad litem at the International Criminal Tribunal for the Former Yugoslavia from 2001 to 2003. She studied at Harvard (LL.B.) and Osgoode Hall Law School (LL.M., D.Jur.) where she was a professor of law.

References

Canadian lawyers
Canadian legal scholars
Academic staff of the Osgoode Hall Law School
International Criminal Tribunal for the former Yugoslavia judges
Canadian judges of United Nations courts and tribunals
Harvard Law School alumni
Osgoode Hall Law School alumni
1951 births
2016 deaths